Sinoe kwakae is a moth of the family Gelechiidae. It is found in North America, where it has been recorded from Louisiana to Florida.

The wingspan is 9.2−12.4 mm. The forewings range from dark grey to brown, with a dark brown subbasal fascia and a dark brown median spot at the base. There are three dark brown spots on the costa and a dark brown median streak beyond the discal cell, surrounded by brown. The terminal area has a black median streak beyond the discal cell and there is a dark brown spot at two-thirds of the dorsum. The hindwings are light grey or brown. Adults are on wing from January to March in the south and from March to June in the north.

Etymology
The species is named for No-bong Kwak, the mother of the senior author.

References

Moths described in 2012
Litini